The 1977 Notre Dame Fighting Irish football team represented the University of Notre Dame during the 1977 NCAA Division I football season.  The Irish, coached by Dan Devine, ended the season with 11 wins and one loss, winning the national championship.  The Fighting Irish won the title by defeating the previously unbeaten and No. 1 ranked Texas Longhorns in the Cotton Bowl Classic by a score of a 38–10. The 1977 squad became the tenth Irish team to win the national title and were led by All-Americans Ken MacAfee, Ross Browner, Luther Bradley, and Bob Golic. Junior Joe Montana, a future Pro Football Hall of Famer, was the team's starting quarterback.

Season
Dan Devine entered his third year as head coach, coming off of a 9–3 season in 1976 that culminated in a Gator Bowl win over Penn State. Devine returned a highly touted defense, featuring 1976 Outland Trophy winner Ross Browner, defensive end Willie Fry, and All-American linebacker Bob Golic. On offense, quarterback Joe Montana earned the starting job and led an offense that included running backs Jerome Heavens and Vagas Ferguson and All-American tight end Ken MacAfee. Montana,  earned a reputation as "the comeback kid", had two come from behind victories in the fourth quarter, against Purdue and Clemson, down 17 and 10 respectively.   After a surprising loss to unranked Ole Miss, patience among the fans was running thin,  who considered Devine's previous 8–3 and 9–3 seasons as lackluster compared to the team success under Devine's predecessor, Ara Parseghian.  The Irish rebounded to win their remaining games, including a 49–19 rout of USC in the now famous "Green Jersey Game." The Irish earned a berth in the Cotton Bowl Classic, where they defeated No. 1 and unbeaten Texas by a score of 38–10 to capture Notre Dame's tenth national title. The Irish leaped four spots in the polls after the Cotton Bowl Classic victory to claim the consensus title.

Schedule

Roster

Game summaries

Pittsburgh

Ole Miss

Ole Miss gave the eventual national champion Notre Dame its only loss of the season.

Purdue

Michigan State

Source:

Army

    
    
    
    

ND: Jerome Heavens 34 Rush, 200 Yds (single game school record - Sitko 1948 vs. Michigan St)

USC

    
    
    
    
    
    
    
    
    

Notre Dame wore green jerseys for the first time since their 1963 game against Syracuse.

Navy

    
    
    
    
    
    
    
    
    
    

Notre Dame wore green jerseys for the second straight week.

Georgia Tech

    
    
    
    
    
    
    
    
    
    
    
    

Notre Dame wore green jerseys for the third straight week, and for every home game through the end of the 1980 season. The 69 points were the second most ever scored at Notre Dame Stadium.

Clemson

    
    
    
    
    
    

This was the first-ever meeting between Notre Dame and Clemson.

Air Force

    
    
    
    
    
    
    

This was the final game for Air Force head coach Ben Martin after 20 seasons. It also remains the most lopsided game in the 30-game series between Notre Dame and Air Force (the Fighting Irish lead 24-6).

Miami (FL)

Texas (Cotton Bowl)

Post-season

Award winners
 Ross Browner, Lombardi Award, Maxwell Award
 Ken MacAfee, Walter Camp Award

Heisman Trophy voting
 Ken MacAfee, 3rd
 Ross Browner, 5th

All-Americans

College Football Hall of Fame inductees

1978 NFL Draft

References

Notre Dame
Notre Dame Fighting Irish football seasons
College football national champions
Cotton Bowl Classic champion seasons
Notre Dame Fighting Irish football